René Le Hénaff (24 April 1901 – 5 January 2005) was a French film editor and director. As a film editor he collaborated with directors Marcel Carné, René Clair, and Géza von Radványi among others. His three films with Carné in the late 1930s — Port of Shadows, Hôtel du Nord, and Le Jour Se Lève — are widely admired examples of poetic realism. He also directed films from 1935 to 1950. Perhaps the best-known is Colonel Chabert (1943), which was a film adaptation of a famous novella by Honoré de Balzac. Le Hénaff retired from filmmaking in 1968.

Selected filmography

Editor
 The Shark (1930)
 Sous les toits de Paris (Under the Roofs of Paris) (1930)
 À Nous la Liberté (1931)
 Bastille Day (1933)
 Le Scandal (The Scandal) (1934)
 Samson (1936)
 Le Quai des brumes (Port of Shadows) (1938)
 Hôtel du Nord (1938)
 Le Jour Se Lève (1939)
 Beating Heart (1940)
 Le Quai des brumes (Women Without Names) (1950)
 L'Étrange Désir de monsieur Bard (Strange Desire of Mr. Bard) (1954)
 A Girl Without Boundaries (1955)
 Der Arzt von Stalingrad (The Doctor of Stalingrad) (1958)
 Twelve Hours by the Clock (1959)

Director
 Fort Dolorès (1939)
 Colonel Chabert (1943)
St. Val's Mystery (1945)
 The Husbands of Leontine (1947)

References

External links
 

French film editors
French centenarians
Men centenarians
1901 births
2005 deaths